Jebreil (also Romanized as Jebre’īl, Jabrā’īl, Jebrā’īl; also known as Jībrā‘il) is a village in Babarashani Rural District, Chang Almas District, Bijar County, Kurdistan Province, Iran. At the 2006 census, its population was 567, in 126 families. The village is populated by Kurds with an Azerbaijani minority.

References 

Towns and villages in Bijar County
Kurdish settlements in Kurdistan Province
Azerbaijani settlements in Kurdistan Province